Kate & Anna McGarrigle is the debut album by Kate & Anna McGarrigle, released in January 1976. Guest musicians on the album include Lowell George, Bobby Keys, and Tony Levin as well as family and friends such as eldest sister Jane McGarrigle, Anna McGarrigle's husband Dane Lanken, and the siblings' old friend Chaim Tannenbaum.

"Swimming Song" was written and originally performed by Kate's husband at the time, singer-songwriter Loudon Wainwright III, who is also referenced (without being explicitly named) in the song "Go Leave".

Reception
In 2011, the British composer and television presenter Howard Goodall chose it as one of his "six best albums", stating "For me the two outstanding cuts are the utterly beautiful 'Heart Like a Wheel' and the French-Canadian pseudo-folk song 'Complainte pour Ste-Catherine'... the pair's gentle harmonies are unmistakable and unforgettable."

Awards
On 25 December 1976, the album was voted Rock Album of the Year by London's Melody Maker. It was also listed at #5 on the 1976 Pazz & Jop poll. In 2016, the album was named as the jury winner of the Polaris Heritage Prize in the 1976-1985 division.

Notable covers
The album includes "Heart Like a Wheel" (by Anna McGarrigle), which was first recorded in 1972 by McKendree Spring, then by Linda Ronstadt in 1974. That song subsequently has been covered by several other artists, including Billy Bragg, Katie Moore, The Corrs, and June Tabor.

Another song from the album, "(Talk to Me of) Mendocino" (by Kate McGarrigle), was also covered by Linda Ronstadt on her 1982 album Get Closer, by the English singer-songwriter John Howard on his 2007 E.P. The Bewlay Brothers, by Nona Marie and The Choir on their 2011 eponymous album, and by Karine Polwart and Dave Milligan on their 2021 record Still As Your Sleeping. 

The song "Complainte pour Ste-Catherine" (by Anna McGarrigle and Philippe Tatartcheff) was covered by the British pop singer Kirsty MacColl in 1989.

The song "Go Leave" (by Kate McGarrigle) was covered by Anne Sofie von Otter with Elvis Costello.

Track listing
"Kiss and Say Goodbye" (Kate McGarrigle) – 2:47
"My Town" (Anna McGarrigle) – 2:57
"Blues in D" (Kate McGarrigle) – 2:43
"Heart Like a Wheel" (Anna McGarrigle) – 3:08
"Foolish You" (Wade Hemsworth) – 3:02 
"(Talk to Me of) Mendocino" (Kate McGarrigle) – 3:08
"Complainte pour Ste-Catherine" (Anna McGarrigle, Philippe Tatartcheff) – 2:48
"Tell My Sister" (Kate McGarrigle) – 3:37
"Swimming Song" (Loudon Wainwright III) – 2:26 
"Jigsaw Puzzle of Life" (Anna McGarrigle) – 2:29
"Go Leave" (Kate McGarrigle) – 3:19
"Travellin' on for Jesus" (Traditional; arranged by J. Spence) – 2:42

Personnel
Anna McGarrigle - vocals, keyboards, banjo, button accordion
Kate McGarrigle - vocals, banjo, piano, guitar
Jane McGarrigle (credited as "Jane McGarrigle Forsland") - organ, backing vocals
Chaim Tannenbaum - guitar, harmonica, backing vocals 
Lowell George, David Spinozza, Greg Prestopino, Hugh McCracken, Tony Rice, Amos Garrett, Andrew Gold - guitar
David Grisman - mandolin
Peter Weldon - banjo, backing vocals
Jay Ungar - fiddle
Gib Guilbeau - fiddle
Red Callender - bass
Tony Levin - bass on "Complainte pour Sainte-Catherine"
Steve Gadd - drums
Russ Kunkel - drums
Joel Tepp - harmonica, clarinet
Bobby Keys - tenor saxophone
Plas Johnson - alto saxophone, clarinet
Nick DeCaro - accordion
Dane Lanken - backing vocals
Technical
John Wood - engineer
Gail Kenney - front cover photography

References

External links
 

1975 debut albums
Kate & Anna McGarrigle albums
Albums produced by Joe Boyd
Warner Music Group albums